Waterlooplein is an underground metro station in the city centre of Amsterdam, Netherlands. There were "open tube" days in 1975 showcasing the station, which was the first time the public got access to the underground tunnels of the metro system.

Waterlooplein, along with other stations on the East Line, had a major renovation in 2016 that brought back the brutalist architecture used in the original station. There are two pieces of artwork located in the station: one in a station hall and the other on the platform level.

Layout 
Each end of the platform goes up to its own hall, with a total of five entrances into the station. Four entrances lead up to the square of the same name, two of which go to the Stopera—the town hall of Amsterdam—while the fifth entrance is located at the Nieuwe Herengracht. A restaurant serving Surinamese food is located inside the station. Between Waterlooplein station and Weesperplein, the line makes a turn as the following curve from Nieuwmarkt to Amsterdam Centraal would have been too tight otherwise.

History

Construction and opening 

In a 1968 metro plan released by the information office of the municipality, the station was called Stadhuis instead of Waterlooplein. In 1970, it was announced that the market organized above on the square would be able to continue despite the construction. Work on the new town hall of the city commenced just before the station.

Most underground areas of the line were constructed by using caissons, which made pumping out groundwater unnecessary. The earth below the caissons were rinsed with water and pumped out, lowering them into their place. There were protests against the construction of the metro, as this method required the demolition of the houses above the line. The resistance at Waterooplein was limited as the neighbourhood had been in a decline. Many of its residents were deported and later killed during World War II, leaving a significant amount of the houses around the square in a bad condition.

Work around the area started in February 1971. The first caisson at Waterlooplein was lowered in January 1972, which immediately resulted in delays as it hit a previously unknown wall  under ground dating back to the 16th century. Several oak revetments of the Amstel river were found during construction, causing more delays to the lowering of the caissons. From August to October 1975, an "open tube" event was organized inside the station, which was the first time that locals were able to see what the metro system of the city would look like. The section of the tunnel from Waterlooplein to Amsterdam Centraal was opened on 11 October 1980.

Later developments 

The station was renovated in 2004 together with Reigersbos as part of the Neat & Tidy project. Another renovation was planned to happen from March to September 2011. The start was delayed several times and eventually started after May. Metro traffic was stopped on 23 July, in accordance with the plan, and restarted on 5 September while the work was still ongoing.

All stations on the East Line were set for another renovation in 2016. The renovation of Waterlooplein commenced in September. The architect of the renovation wanted to revert back to the brutalist architecture used in the original station design. Paint on the walls were removed to reveal the bare concrete. Metro traffic still continued as entrances were closed one by one. Some of the features added after initial construction, such as the usage of primary colours and a black ceiling, were kept after the renovation. Windows were created at two of the entrances. Cables, cable ducts and pipes were concealed for tidiness. Het Parool wrote that after the renovation "[the station] suddenly look[s] as if [it is] no longer just from the past, but also a bit from now." In April 2017, the Gemeente Vervoerbedrijf started to play music through the speakers of underground metro stations as a test. The type of music would depend on the time of day: slow and calming music during rush hours, and energetic music during the afternoon.

Artwork 

Artists were invited by officials for artwork inside the stations on the East Line, with the exception of Weesperplein and Bijlmer.

Waterloo by Willem Sandberg consists of blue and red letters on the platform walls spelling out the name of the work. The typographic artwork consists of basic shapes—circles, rectangles, triangles and trapezoids—with frayed edges. The letters were planned to be removed during the 2016 renovation, as well as a few other artworks in different stations, as they were damaged. They were kept in the end due to their "cultural-historical value". Smoke screen panels were installed on the artwork to stop the spread of smoke in case of a fire. The advertisements on the walls near the letters were also removed.

Located on one of the station halls, Sporen van verlichte voetstappen by Dirk Müller is made up of several plexiglass plates of footsteps that leave a trace on the floor which continues on to a wall. The lights of the footprints illuminate one by one creating a walking motion. The footsteps were initially planned to be on Spaklerweg station, but were given to Waterlooplein due to delays with the work at Spaklerweg.

Services 
The station is served by metro lines 51, 53 and 54. North-bound, all three lines use the same track and end at Amsterdam Centraal. South-bound, M53 ends at Gaasperplas, while M54 ends at Gein. M51 used to serve the Amstelveen suburb by heading south after Amsterdam Zuid station and end at Westwijk. The section after Zuid was closed in 2019 and replaced by a tramline. M51 now continues west-bound after Zuid and ends at Isolatorweg. A tram stop near the enterance shares the same name as the metro station and is served by tram line 14 during the day. At night, night buses N85, N86, N87, N89, N91 and N93 stop near the station.

References

Citations

Bibliography

External links 
Official website 

Amsterdam Metro stations
Railway stations opened in 1980